You Should Be Here may refer to:

You Should Be Here (mixtape), by Kehlani
You Should Be Here (Cole Swindell album), 2016
"You Should Be Here" (song), its title track